Watoto Church, formerly Kampala Pentecostal Church (KPC) is an English-speaking cell-based East African community church headquartered in Kampala, Uganda. Watoto means "the children" in Swahili.

Background
The church was founded in 1984 in Kampala by Canadian missionaries Pastor Gary Skinner and his wife, Marylin.

Initially, it operated out of Kampala's Imperial Hotel before the leadership took over a disused cinema which was renamed The Centre. Today, Watoto occupies its own purpose-built campus in Kampala and earns £13.3 million a year

Structure
Watoto's main church is dubbed Watoto Church Downtown and has expanded over the years across the city with Watoto Church Kisaasi, Bweyogerere, Lubowa, Kyengera, Kansanga, Bugolobi and Entebbe. The church has also expanded across Uganda with Watoto Church Bbira in Wakiso District, Watoto Church Suubi in Mpigi District, Watoto Church Gulu and Watoto Church Laminadera in Gulu District and Watoto Church Mbarara in Mbarara City.

Vision 
The vision of the Church is to Celebrate Christ and care for the community. The church is fast growing and it already has a campus in war-torn South Sudan, Watoto Church Juba.

Congregation 
The church has an average congregation of 27,000 people who also meet in smaller cell groups. Each cell comprises about 7 to 10 members who meet at least once a week in members' homes to share in fellowship.

Leadership
Watoto Church has a leadership structure, with the Church Council at its apex. It is the overall policy organ of Watoto Church and all its ministries. The council is responsible for strategic policy decisions as well as the management and smooth running of the church. It is made up of the Pastoral Team, the Elders' Team and the Deacons' Team.

The Skinners remain the general overseers of the entire ministry. Pastor Julius Rwotlonyo is current pastoral Associate team leaders, assisted by various campus pastors and other ministry leaders. The pastoral team, led by Pastor Edward Mwesigye, is responsible for the spiritual oversight of the church and its membership. Their approach to ministry is holistic and hence, the fruit thereof is an enhancement of the whole man - spirit, soul and body.

The deacons' team is responsible for the physical needs of the church.

Their responsibilities include:

 Drafting of policies to govern day to day operations of the church, use of church property, handling of church finances, staff and any other aspect of the church as and when the need arises.
 Oversight of the financial and business affairs of the church. They assist in ministry of ordinances, hiring, discipline, and removal of church employees and ensuring that the pastors and all the employees of the church are adequately remunerated.
 The deacons also assist in management, upkeep and maintenance of the church property. On behalf of the Church Council, the deacon's team is also responsible for the appointment of all the department team leaders of the church.

The elders' team is responsible for governing the direction of the church, guarding its doctrines, and together with the pastoral team, provide direction and authority within the church, encouraging and empowering members of the congregation to do what God has given them the ability to do.

Children's Work
Watoto Church is home to Watoto Child Care Ministries, a ministry that assists vulnerable children and women in Uganda and which is best known for its Watoto Children's Choirs that tour internationally, proselytizing, and raising money for the organisation. Watoto currently operates 3 villages for orphaned children. These are home to more than 3000 children.

Christmas Cantata
Watoto Church produces an annual Christmas cantata. And a gospel drama play every four years known as Heaven's Gates and Hell's Flames. The shows are a mixture of live performance music, dance, scripted drama, sounds and lighting effects. Historically, the cantata has run through the week before Christmas.

ISO Investigation
During the COVID-19 pandemic, the church was criticised for going ahead with a tour by its internationally renowned children's choir. According to the then Uganda's child affairs minister, the Internal Security Organisation needed investigating Watoto church for alleged breaches of child labour laws. These include alleged taking of children out of the country without permission and putting them. Seven members of the choir and seven adults on the tour with the children contracted COVID-19, but all recovered. Although 80 other members of the choir remain ed stranded overseas, all of them eventually returned home safely.

Views on Sexuality
Watoto Church adheres to the biblical standard of sexuality recognising that it is a gift from God to be enjoyed only within the confines of a monogamous, heterosexual marriage relationship. Watoto Church is in favour of pro-family legislation that reflects and preserves this biblical standard providing security for all members of society. Watoto Church remains committed to providing help to anyone grappling with the moral and sexual issues of life.

For this reason, Watoto Church has received criticism for its stance on homosexuality.  See Scott Lively to visit  and the 2014 Uganda Anti-Homosexuality Act allegedly arose as a result of the conference. The act was however repealed by Ugandan courts Ugandan court strikes down anti-gay legislation

References

External links
Watoto Church official website
Watoto Children's Choir official website

Buildings and structures in Kampala
Churches in Uganda
Evangelical megachurches in Uganda
Pentecostalism in Africa
Pentecostal churches